Bulbostylis is a genus of plants in the sedge family. They are sometimes called hairsedges. There are over 200 species of these clump-forming plants of dry grasslands and warm and tropical savannas worldwide. They have solid, rounded, grooved stems and long, thin basal leaves. They bear spikelets of flowers.

Selected species:
Bulbostylis barbata - watergrass
Bulbostylis bathiei
Bulbostylis boeckleriana
Bulbostylis burbidgeae
Bulbostylis cangae
Bulbostylis capillaris - densetuft hairsedge
Bulbostylis ciliatifolia - capillary hairsedge
Bulbostylis cioniana (Savi) Lye 
Bulbostylis coleotricha 
Bulbostylis curassavica - West Indian hairsedge
Bulbostylis eleocharoides
Bulbostylis fasciculata
Bulbostylis fluviatilis
Bulbostylis funckii - Funck's hairsedge
Bulbostylis haitiensis
Bulbostylis hispidula
Bulbostylis junciformis - Caribbean hairsedge
Bulbostylis juncoides - rush hairsedge
Bulbostylis lichtensteiniana - tussock sedge
Bulbostylis neglecta - neglected tuftsedge
Bulbostylis pauciflora - fewflower hairsedge
Bulbostylis schaffneri - Schaffner's hairsedge
Bulbostylis stenophylla - sandy field hairsedge
Bulbostylis turbinata
Bulbostylis vestita - tufted hairsedge
Bulbostylis warei - Ware's hairsedge

References

External links
Jepson Manual Treatment

 
Cyperaceae genera